Allotinus melos is a butterfly in the family Lycaenidae. It was described by Hamilton Herbert Druce in 1896. It is found on the Philippines (Mindanao and Palawan), Balabac Island and Borneo.

References

Butterflies described in 1896
Allotinus
Butterflies of Borneo
Butterflies of Asia
Taxa named by Hamilton Herbert Druce